Pierre-Boucher—Les Patriotes—Verchères is a federal electoral district in Quebec. It encompasses a portion of Quebec that had been included in the electoral districts of Longueuil—Pierre-Boucher and Verchères—Les Patriotes.

Pierre-Boucher—Les Patriotes—Verchères was created by the 2012 federal electoral boundaries redistribution and was legally defined in the 2013 representation order. It came into effect upon the call of the 2015 federal election, held 19 October 2015.

The riding was supposed to be named Boucher—Les Patriotes—Verchères.

Profile
The Bloc Québécois has traditionally drawn stronger support in the northern, more rural, areas of the riding (such as Varennes or Saint-Amable) while the other parties (mainly the Liberals, but also the NDP) have drawn their support more in the south, especially in the suburban city of Boucherville.

During the 2015 election the elected Member of Parliament (MP) Xavier Barsalou-Duval has the dubious distinction of being the MP elected with the smallest percentage of the popular vote receiving just 28.6% of the vote.

Demographics
According to the Canada 2016 Census

 Languages: (2016) 95.0% French, 1.7% English, 0.8% Spanish, 0.4% Arabic, 0.4% Italian, 0.2% Portuguese, 0.1% Romanian, 0.1% Mandarin, 0.1% Creole, 0.1% Russian,  0.1% Polish, 0.1% German, 0.1% Persian, 0.1% Greek

Members of Parliament

This riding has elected the following Members of Parliament:

Election results

References

Boucherville
Varennes, Quebec
Quebec federal electoral districts
2013 establishments in Quebec
Marguerite-D'Youville Regional County Municipality